Falcaria  may refer to:
 Falcaria (moth), an animal genus in the family Drepanidae
 Falcaria (plant), a plant genus in the family Apiaceae